Diego Alfonso Martínez Balderas (born 15 February 1981) is a Mexican former professional footballer who played as a right-back.

Biography
Martínez made his debut in the Invierno 2001 season with Necaxa. His ability to attack made him a fan favorite and quickly earned him a starting position. He signed with Chivas in 2006, where he immediately became an important part of the team.
Martínez usually played in the right wingback position with Chivas, providing the team with crosses and through passes in the attack. However, he excelled more in his defending duties.

Martínez lost favor with Chivas and was sent out on loan with various teams such as Morelia, Tigres, C.F. Monterrey, San Luis, Tiburones Rojos de Veracruz, and most recently CF La Piedad, until July 2012, when he received a second shot with Chivas, which included Diego in the squad for the next Apertura tournament. He was then released from his contract and he signed with Querétaro. He was only featured in the Copa MX.
After his release of yet another team, Martínez chose to retire. In 2014, he joined an organization named Glorias del Deporte, aimed to get kids to play football and get away from drugs. He is one of the head coaches, and the organization travels all over Mexico.

International career
Martínez has played in several national Mexican youth teams, and was captain of the Mexican National U-23 Team during the 2004 Olympic Trials. He received his first summons for the senior Mexico national team in 2003. Martínez was called upon by former Mexico national team coach Ricardo Antonio Lavolpe on several occasions in search for the team that would play in the 2006 FIFA World Cup.

Career statistics

International goals

|- bgcolor=#DFE7FF
| 1. || March 10, 2004 || Tuxtla Gutierrez, Mexico ||  || 2–1 || Win || Friendly
|- bgcolor=#DFE7FF
| 2. || March 31, 2004 || Carson, California, United States ||  || 2–0 || Win || Friendly
|- bgcolor=#DFE7FF
| 3. || October 26, 2005 || Guadalajara, Jalisco, Mexico ||  || 3–1 || Win ||Friendly
|}

International caps
As of 28 January 2009

Honours
Mexico U23
CONCACAF Olympic Qualifying Championship: 2004

External links
 
 
 
 
 
 Chivas Loan out Pineda and Martínez to San Luis

1981 births
Living people
Footballers from Mexico City
Mexico international footballers
C.D. Guadalajara footballers
Atlético Morelia players
Club Necaxa footballers
Tigres UANL footballers
San Luis F.C. players
C.F. Monterrey players
C.D. Veracruz footballers
Liga MX players
Association football defenders
Mexican footballers
Footballers at the 2003 Pan American Games
Pan American Games bronze medalists for Mexico
Medalists at the 2003 Pan American Games
Pan American Games medalists in football